Wooldridge is a town in Amathole District Municipality in the Eastern Cape province of South Africa.

The village is 16 km east of Peddie. It developed from a settlement of the German Legion. It was named after Colonel J W Wooldridge who was an officer under Baron von Stutterheim.

References

Populated places in the Ngqushwa Local Municipality